Nassarius webbei is a species of sea snail, a marine gastropod mollusk in the family Nassariidae, the Nassa mud snails or dog whelks.

Description
The shell grows to a length of 17 mm.

Distribution
This species occurs in the Atlantic Ocean off Cape Verde Islands and Senegal.

References

 Rolán E., 2005. Malacological Fauna From The Cape Verde Archipelago. Part 1, Polyplacophora and Gastropoda.
 Rolán E. & Hernández J.M. (2005) The West African species of the group Nassarius denticulatus (Mollusca, Neogastropoda), with the description of a new species. Journal of Conchology 38(5): 499–511. page(s): 504

External links
 Adam, W. & Knudsen, J. (1984). Révision des Nassariidae (Mollusca: Gastropoda Prosobranchia) de l'Afrique occidentale. Bulletin de l'Institut Royal des Sciences Naturelles de Belgique. 55 (9): 1-95, 5 pl.
 

Nassariidae
Gastropods described in 1850
Molluscs of the Atlantic Ocean
Gastropods of Cape Verde
Invertebrates of West Africa